Kumovo (Qom) is a rural locality (a selo) in Karmanovsky Selsoviet, Yanaulsky District, Bashkortostan, Russia.

Population 
The population was 268 as of 2010. There are 10 streets.

Geography 
Kumovo is located 47 km southwest of Yanaul (the district's administrative centre) by road. Amzya is the nearest rural locality.

References 

Rural localities in Yanaulsky District